Bahaeddin Shakir or Bahaddin Şakir (1874 – 17 April 1922) was a physician, Turkish nationalist politician, and one of the architects of the Armenian genocide. Though he was not a minister or deputy in the government, he held powerful sway in the Central Committee of the Committee of Union and Progress and was the director of the Şura-yı Ümmet, a newspaper that supported the party. He was one of the three important names of the "Doctors Group" in the CUP (the other two being Doctor Nâzım and Doctor Rüsuhi Dikmen); He was a part of the pan-Turkist/Turanist wing of Union and Progress.

During World War I Şakir was part of the leadership of the Teşkilât-ı Mahsusa. At the end of that war he was detained with other members of the CUP, first by a local Ottoman court martial and then by the British government. He was sent to Malta pending military trials for crimes against humanity, which never materialized, and was subsequently exchanged by Britain for hostages held by Turkish nationalist forces. On 17 April 1922, he was assassinated along with Cemal Azmi in Berlin.

Early life 
Bahaddin Şakir was born in Sliven, Ottoman Empire (now part of Bulgaria).

Medical education and exile 

After graduating from the School of Military Medicine as a medical captain in 1894, Şakir studied medical jurisprudence in France. In 1900, he became a judicial medical assistant at the same school. With Dr. Mustafa Hayrullah (Diker), they became pioneers of this field of research. Şakir was also Şehzade Yusuf İzzeddin's private doctor in addition to his post in the hospital. He established relations with Ahmed Rıza and the members of the Committee of Union and Progress. For this he was exiled to Erzincan. Şakir was arrested there when authorities discovered that he sent aid to the committee and exiled him further to Trabzon. In 1905 he fled to Egypt and from there to Paris. In Paris he met Doctor Nazım and reconnected with Ahmet Rıza. In exile he wrote articles in Şura-yı Ümmet, a newspaper that was a CUP mouthpiece.

Bahaddin Şakir was instrumental in reviving the CUP inside the Ottoman Empire (by the turn of the 20th century it was an organization of exiled intellectuals). He secretly traveled to Constantinople set the infrastructure for a new internal center for the organization. In 1906, the Ottoman Freedom Society would be founded, which merged with the CUP in 1907 and become its internal center for revolutionary activity.

Second Constitutional Era 
After the proclamation of the Second Constitutional Monarchy in 1908, Şakir returned to Constantinople and to his former duty at the School of Military Medicine. He wrote Turkey's first copyrighted textbook on forensic medicine. He became a professor on the subject at Haydarpaşa Faculty of Medicine, which was established in 1909 with the merging of military and civilian medical schools. The following year, Şakir was elected as the second head of the medical faculty. He continued writing for the Şura-yı Ümmet. Meanwhile, he continued his journalism by harshly criticizing his opponents in his unsigned books titled Ali Kemal Davası (The Case of Ali Kemal) and "Kanuni Esasimizi İhlal Edenler" (Opponents of our Constitution).

Bahaddin Şakir worked as the chief physician in Adrianople's (Edirne) hospital during its siege by the Bulgarians the in the First Balkan War. He was captured and then released after the city's surrender.

He was then appointed head of the political department of the secret organization called Teşkilât-ı Mahsusa (Special Organization), which was established in 1913. In the same year, he was appointed to the Directorate of Forensic Medicine, which was established under the General Directorate of Health.

Armenian genocide

Bahaddin Şakir brought up deportations as a solution to the "Armenian Question" in the CUP's 1910 congress. In 1915 he was able to put his vision to the test. As the central figure of Special Organization Şakir's organization was instrumental in enforced of the Tehcir law. For this, he has been described as "one of the architects" of the Armenian genocide. Halil Berktay writes that local governors objected to Şakir's deportation orders and called for his arrest. Dissidents were usually replaced by Unionist hardliners; sometimes twice if the replacement was not pliant. Şakir was involved in the subduing and deportation of the Armenian population in Ardanuç, where he was the head of the Special Organization, and Ardahan in 1914.
On 3 March 1915, Şakir sent a letter stating

Based on this letter, Turkish historian Taner Akçam concluded that the Armenian genocide must have been ordered prior to that date.

Journey to Moscow 
With the Ottoman Empire's surrender, Şakir fled to Berlin via Sevastopol on a German torpedo boat with Enver Pasha, Talat Pasha and four other high ranking Unionists. In absentia he was tried by the court nicknamed the "Nemrut Mustafa Divan" and was sentenced to death for waging war and massacring Armenians. From Berlin, Şakir and Enver traveled to Moscow to get Bolshevik assistance for the Turks in their war for independence. 

The journey there was troubled. Their first flight took off from the German border and crashed in the outskirts of Kaunas, Lithuania. Fortunately for the two of them they weren't recognized by journalists or the Allied forces stationed there until they were about to leave. Their return flight to Berlin also crashed. Enver's insistence to arrive to Moscow by plane costed them another plane crash in flight trials. Eventually Cemal Pasha joined them in Berlin, and using a plane that successfully passed flight tests they set off once again for Moscow. But hearing strange noises from the engine, Enver asked the pilot to turn back, and the plane disintegrated upon landing. While Enver was determined to make a grand entrance from the sky Şakir and Cemal gave up and instead joined a Russian prisoner of war convoy heading back to their homeland. After several more bizarre mishaps Enver finally met the two of them at Moscow (he came by land in the end).

Şakir participated in the Congress of the Peoples of the East, which was held in Baku in September 1920. He was the Baku representative of the Union of Islamic Revolutionary Societies (İslam İhtilal Cemiyetleri İttihadı). After attending the congress of the organization held in Moscow in the spring of 1921, he returned to Germany.

Assassination

In the autumn of 1919, the Armenian Revolutionary Federation (ARF) decided to punish the executors of the Armenian Genocide. Under Operation Nemesis, Aram Yerganian and Arshavir Shirakian were given the task to assassinate Cemal Azmi and Şakir who were both in Berlin. On 17 April 1922, Shirakian and Yerganian encountered Azmi and Şakir walking with their families on Uhlandstraße. Shirakian managed to kill Azmi and wound Şakir. Yerganian immediately ran after Şakir and killed him with a shot to his head. The assassins were never detained.

Legacy

Şakir and Azmi were buried in the cemetery of Şehitlik Mosque in Berlin.

In 1926, the Republic of Turkey granted the families of those killed in Operation Nemesis a pension fund. Bahaddin Şakir was also included in the list accepted by the assembly, along with Talat, Azmi, Said Halim Pasha, Cemal Pasha, and his aides Süreyya and Nusret.

His life was published as a book by Hikmet Çiçek in 2004 called Dr. Bahattin Şakir: İttihat ve Terakki’den Teşkilatı Mahsusa’ya Bir Türk Jakobeni (Dr. Bahattin Şakir: a Turkish Jacobin from Union and Progress to Teşkilatı Mahsusa ).

In 2005, Kurdish-German politician  brought up their "graves
of honour" and Armenian genocide denial in a session of parliament.

References

Sources

1874 births
1922 deaths
Physicians from Istanbul
Political people from the Ottoman Empire
Assassinated people from the Ottoman Empire
Deaths by firearm in Germany
Malta exiles
People convicted by the Ottoman Special Military Tribunal
Members of the Special Organization (Ottoman Empire)
Ottoman people of World War I
Committee of Union and Progress politicians
19th-century physicians from the Ottoman Empire
20th-century physicians from the Ottoman Empire
People from the Ottoman Empire murdered abroad
People murdered in Berlin
People assassinated by Operation Nemesis
Armenian genocide perpetrators
Politicians from Istanbul
1922 murders in Germany
1920s murders in Berlin
Expatriates from the Ottoman Empire in France